Joseph T. Bellon (born 15 May 1976) is a Sierra Leonean former weightlifter. He competed in the men's middleweight event at the 2000 Summer Olympics.

References

External links
 

1976 births
Living people
Sierra Leonean male weightlifters
Olympic weightlifters of Sierra Leone
Weightlifters at the 2000 Summer Olympics
Place of birth missing (living people)